Telecommando Americano is an album by the American band Material Issue, released in 1997, one year after frontman Jim Ellison's suicide. It was the band's fourth album. The band's debut six-song EP, released on vinyl in 1987, was included with the album.

Production
The songs originated as voice/guitar demos by Ellison and were finished by his bandmates; they were recorded in 1995 and 1996. They are not autobiographical, as Ellison was not a fan of confessional songwriting. "(0.15)", the final song, is 15 seconds of intentionally recorded silence. "Carousel" is a ballad. "Off the Hook" employs the busy signal of a phone line as its rhythmic foundation.

Critical reception

Dallas Observer wrote that Material Issue's "mix of plaintive post-adolescent longing (and anger), rock convention, and snappy songcraft reflected the pop ideals kept alive by New Wave into yet another decade while preserving the bleeding heart of an earlier era." Phoenix New Times opined: "If the power-pop crowd needs its Layla and Other Assorted Love Songs to wallow in, this is surely it."

The Chicago Tribune called the album "a top-down, crank-the-amps blend of three-minute rockers and equally terse, heart-crushing ballads that reaffirms Material Issue's stature as among the best things to happen to Midwest power-pop since the 1970s heyday of Cheap Trick and the Raspberries." The Chicago Sun-Times deemed it "a strong, fitting close to the band's all too short legacy of perfect pop songs."

AllMusic wrote: "No matter how good these are, there's a sense that Ellison took his life before he reached his full potential, and that's really what makes Telecommando Americano so sad—he had the gift, but he hadn't completely mastered it yet." The A.V. Club noted that "as hopes of stardom faded, the darkness increasingly came to the fore."

Track listing

References

Material Issue albums
1997 albums
Rykodisc albums